Anas is a genus of dabbling ducks. It includes the pintails, most teals, and the mallard and its close relatives. It formerly included additional species but following the publication of a molecular phylogenetic study in 2009 the genus was split into four separate genera. The genus now contains 31 living species. The name Anas is the Latin for "duck".

Systematics
The genus Anas was introduced by the Swedish naturalist Carl Linnaeus in 1758 in the tenth edition of his Systema Naturae. Anas is the Latin word for a duck. The genus formerly included additional species. In 2009 a large molecular phylogentic study was published that compared mitochondrial DNA sequences from ducks, geese and swans in the family Anatidae. The results confirmed some of the conclusions of earlier smaller studies and indicated that the genus as then defined was non-monophyletic. Based on the results of this study, Anas was split into four proposed monophyletic genera with five species including the wigeons transferred to the resurrected genus Mareca, ten species including the shovelers and some teals transferred to the resurrected genus Spatula and the Baikal teal placed in the monotypic genus Sibirionetta.

Species
There are 31 extant species recognised in the genus:

Extinct Species
Mariana mallard, Anas oustaleti
Mascarene teal, Anas theodori
Chatham Island Duck, Anas chathamica

Formerly placed in Anas:
Bronze-winged duck, Speculanas specularis
Crested duck, Lophonetta specularioides
Baikal teal Sibirionetta formosa
Salvadori's teal, Salvadorina waigiuensis
species in the genus Mareca, the wigeons (including the gadwall and the falcated duck)
species in the genus Spatula, the shovelers and related teals

Phylogeny
Cladogram based on the analysis of Gonzalez and colleagues published in 2009.

Fossil record

A number of fossil species of Anas have been described. Their relationships are often undetermined:
 †Anas sp. (Late Miocene of China)
 †Anas sp. (mid-sized species from the Late Miocene of Rudabánya, Hungary)
 †Anas amotape (Campbell 1979) (Talara Tar Seeps Late Pleistocene of Peru)
 †Anas bunkeri (Wetmore 1944) (Early -? Middle Pliocene – Early Pleistocene of WC USA) – Nettion red-and-green head clade?
 †Anas cheuen Agnolín 2006 (Early-Middle Pleistocene of Argentina) – Dafila?
 †Anas elapsum (Chinchilla Late Pleistocene of Condamine River, Australia) ("Nettion")
 †Anas ganii (Late Pliocene/Early Pleistocene of Tchichmiknaia, Moldavia)
 †Anas gracilipes (Late Pleistocene of Australia) (likely junior synonym of Anas castanea)
 †Anas greeni (Brodkorb 1964) (Ash Hollow Late Miocene?/Early Pliocene of South Dakota, USA) – Nettion red-and-green head clade (doubtful)?
 †Anas itchtucknee McCoy 1963
 †Anas kisatibiensis [Anser kisatibiensis] (Early Pliocene of Kisatibi, Georgia)
 †Anas kurochkini Zelenkov & Panteleyev 2015
 †Anas lambrechti [Archaeoquerquedula lambrechti Stephens; Querquedula lambrechti; Archeoquerquedula Spillman 1942]
 †Anas ogallalae (Brodkorb 1962) (Ogallala Late Miocene?/Early Pliocene of Kansas, USA) – Nettion red-and-green head clade (doubtful)?
Bermuda Islands flightless duck †Anas pachyscelus Wetmore 1960 (Shore Hills Late Pleistocene of Bermuda, W Atlantic)
 †Anas pullulans (Juntura Late Miocene?/Early Pliocene of Juntura, Malheur County, Oregon, USA) – Punanetta?
 †Anas schneideri Emslie 1985 (Late Pleistocene of Little Box Elder Cave, USA)
 †Anas sansaniensis Milne-Edwards 1868 [Dendrocygna sansaniensis (Milne-Edwards 1868) Mlíkovský 1988]
 †Anas strenuum (Late Pleistocene of Patteramordu, Australia) ("Nettion")

Several prehistoric waterfowl supposedly part of the Anas assemblage are nowadays not placed in this genus anymore, at least not with certainty:
 †"Anas" basaltica (Late Oligocene of "Warnsdorf", Czech Republic) is apparently an indeterminate heron.
 †"Anas" blanchardi, "A." consobrina, "A." natator are now in Mionetta
 †"Anas" creccoides (Early-mid Oligocene of Belgium), "A." risgoviensis (Late Miocene of Bavaria, Germany) and "A." skalicensis (Early Miocene of "Skalitz", Czech Republic), though possibly anseriform, cannot be placed with any certainty among modern birds at all.
 †"Anas" albae (Late Miocene of Polgárdi, Hungary), "A." eppelsheimensis (Early Pliocene of Eppelsheim, Germany), "A." isarensis (Late Miocene of Aumeister, Germany) and "A." luederitzensis (Kalahari Early Miocene of Lüderitzbucht, Namibia) are apparently Anatidae of unclear affiliations; the first might be a seaduck.
 †"Anas" integra and "A." oligocaena are now in Dendrochen.
 †"Anas" lignitifila from the Late Miocene of Tuscana has been moved to its own genus, Bambolinetta, being a highly unusual marine waterfowl.
 †"Anas" robusta is now tentatively placed in Anserobranta.
 †"Anas" velox (Middle – Late? Miocene of C Europe) and "A." meyerii (Middle Miocene of Öhningen, Germany; possibly the same species) do not seem to belong Anas, and they may be ancestral dabbling ducks.

Highly problematic, albeit in a theoretical sense, is the placement of the moa-nalos. These are in may be derived from a common ancestor of the Pacific black duck, the Laysan duck, and the mallard, and an unknown amount of other lineages. Phylogenetically, they may even form a clade within the traditional genus Anas. However, as opposed to these species – which are well representative of dabbling ducks in general – the moa-nalos are the most radical departure from the anseriform bauplan known to science. This illustrates that in a truly evolutionary sense, a strictly phylogenetic taxonomy may be difficult to apply.

See also
 List of recently extinct birds
 Late Quaternary prehistoric birds
 List of fossil bird genera

References

External links

 
Dabbling ducks
Bird genera
Taxa named by Carl Linnaeus